Penicillium inusitatum is a species of the genus of Penicillium.

References

inusitatum
Fungi described in 1968